The Taipei Open is a tournament for female professionals played on indoor carpet. In 2011, it was known was the OEC Taipei Ladies Open. It is held at the National Taiwan University Gymnasium and the Taipei Arena. Peng Shuai was the defending champion, but chose to participate at the Tournament of Champions instead.

As a result, Ayumi Morita won the title defeating Kimiko Date-Krumm in the final 6–2, 6–2.

Seeds

Main draw

Finals

Top half

Bottom half

References
 Main Draw
 Qualifying Draw

OEC Taipei Ladies Open - Singles
Taipei WTA Ladies Open